Sergei Krivonosov (May 29, 1971, Rostov-on-Don) is a Russian political figure and deputy of the 6th, 7th, and 8th State Dumas. 

In 1992, Krivonosov graduated from the Novocherkassk Higher Military Command School of Communications. From 1991 to 1994, he served at the Northwestern Group of Forces in Tallinn and headed the communications platoon. After being transferred to the reserve, Krivonosov engaged in investment in the Black Sea coast tourism. For the next 15 years, he headed several commercial organizations. In 2002, Krivonosov joined the United Russia. In 2011, he became a deputy of the 6th State Duma. He was re-elected for the 7th and 8th State Dumas. In the Duma, Krivonosov works as Deputy Chairman of the Committee for Tourism and Development of Tourism Infrastructure.

In 2017, Krivonosov became the wealthiest among deputies from the Krasnodar Krai constituency with a monthly income of 4,2 mln rubles.

On 24 March 2022, the United States Treasury sanctioned him in response to the 2022 Russian invasion of Ukraine.

References

1971 births
Living people
United Russia politicians
21st-century Russian politicians
Eighth convocation members of the State Duma (Russian Federation)
Seventh convocation members of the State Duma (Russian Federation)
Sixth convocation members of the State Duma (Russian Federation)
Russian individuals subject to the U.S. Department of the Treasury sanctions